Jeanne Marie Ford (previously known as Jeanne Marie Grunwell) is an American television soap opera writer. She is also an English teacher at Hagerstown Community College.

Positions held
As the World Turns
 Script Writer: July 30, 2007 - October 18, 2007

Days of Our Lives
 Script Writer: 2000 - 2003, 2007, December 11, 2008 – 2011; August 17, 2012-present
 Associate Head Writer: 2001, 2003–2004; October 24, 2008 – August 25, 2011
 Script Editor: 2004 - 2005, 2005–2007; August 26, 2011 – August 16, 2012
 Occasional Script Writer: 2004
 Continuity Coordinator: 1999 - 2000
 Writer's Assistant: 1992 - 1996

One Life to Live (hired by Ron Carlivati)
 Script Writer: November 26, 2007 - September 2008

Awards and nominations
Writers Guild of America Award
Nomination, 2001, Best Writing, Days of our Lives

External links

American soap opera writers
Year of birth missing (living people)
Living people